The former United Hebrews of Ocala synagogue is a historic Carpenter Gothic building located at 729 N.E. 2nd Street, in the Tuscawilla Park Historic District of Ocala, Florida. Built in 1888, it was one of the first synagogues in Florida. It is listed in the Marion County section of A Guide to Florida's Historic Architecture, published in 1989 by the University of Florida Press in Gainesville. In 1963, the congregation adopted the name Temple B'nai Darom. The building is a contributing property to the historic district.  It is among the oldest synagogue buildings still standing in the United States.

Current use
Since 1976 Temple B'nai Darom has worshiped in a new building at 49 Banyan Course in Ocala. The historic building on 2nd Street was sold and is now the Ocala Bible Chapel, a Christian congregation. It was purchased in 2011 and became Good News Baptist Church of Ocala, FL a Christian congregation.

See also
Carpenter Gothic
Oldest synagogues in the United States

References

Gallery

External links

Temple B'nai Darom
Ocala Bible Chapel
Tuscawilla Park Historic District
Statement of significance
Florida Jewish History
Florida Jewish Museum

Former synagogues in Florida
Carpenter Gothic architecture in Florida
Carpenter Gothic synagogues
National Register of Historic Places in Marion County, Florida
Reform synagogues in Florida
Historic district contributing properties in Florida
Buildings and structures in Ocala, Florida
Synagogues on the National Register of Historic Places in Florida
1888 establishments in Florida
Synagogues completed in 1888
Religious organizations established in 1888